Clavelina sabbadini is a species of tunicate (sea squirt), in the genus Clavelina (the "little bottles"). Like all ascidians, these sessile animals are filter feeders.

Distribution
This species is found in European waters and in the Mediterranean Sea.

References

Enterogona
Animals described in 1987